Joshua Barton Willie (born 14 January 1984) is an Australian politician. He has been the Labor member for Elwick in the Tasmanian Legislative Council since May 2016.

References

External links

1984 births
Living people
Australian Labor Party members of the Parliament of Tasmania
Members of the Tasmanian Legislative Council
Australian schoolteachers
21st-century Australian politicians